The 1959 Women's World Chess Championship was won by Elisabeth Bykova, who successfully defended her title in a match against challenger Kira Zvorykina.

1959 Candidates Tournament

The Candidates Tournament was held in Plovdiv in May 1959 and won by Zvorykina, who earned the right to challenge the reigning champion Bykova for the title.

{| class="wikitable"
|+ 1959 Women's Candidates Tournament
|-
! !! Player !! 1 !! 2 !! 3 !! 4 !! 5 !! 6 !! 7 !! 8 !! 9 !! 10 !! 11 !! 12 !! 13 !! 14 !! 15 !! Points !! Tie break
|- style="background:#cfc;"
| 1 ||  || - || ½ || ½ || ½ || ½ || 1 || ½ || 1 || 1 || 1 || 1 || 1 || 1 || 1 || 1 || 11½ || 
|-
| 2 ||  || ½ || - || ½ || 1 || 1 || 1 || 1 || ½ || 1 || 0 || 1 || 1 || 1 || ½ || ½ || 10½ || 
|-
| 3 ||  || ½ || ½ || - || ½ || ½ || 0 || 1 || ½ || 1 || 1 || 1 || 0 || 1 || 1 || 1 || 9½ || 
|-
| 4 ||  || ½ || 0 || ½ || - || ½ || 0 || 1 || ½ || 1 || 1 || ½ || ½ || 1 || 1 || 1 || 9 || 54.00
|-
| 5 ||  || ½ || 0 || ½ || ½ || - || 0 || ½ || 1 || 1 || ½ || 1 || ½ || 1 || 1 || 1 || 9 || 53.50
|-
| 6 ||  || 0 || 0 || 1 || 1 || 1 || - || 0 || 1 || 0 || 1 || 0 || ½ || ½ || 1 || 1 || 8 || 
|-
| 7 ||  || ½ || 0 || 0 || 0 || ½ || 1 || - || 0 || ½ || 1 || ½ || ½ || 1 || 1 || 1 || 7½ || 
|-
| 8 ||  || 0 || ½ || ½ || ½ || 0 || 0 || 1 || - || 0 || ½ || ½ || 1 || 1 || 1 || ½ || 7 || 
|-
| 9 ||  || 0 || 0 || 0 || 0 || 0 || 1 || ½ || 1 || - || 0 || ½ || 1 || ½ || 1 || 1 || 6½ || 
|-
| 10 ||  || 0 || 1 || 0 || 0 || ½ || 0 || 0 || ½ || 1 || - || ½ || ½ || 1 || ½ || ½ || 6 || 
|-
| 11 ||  || 0 || 0 || 0 || ½ || 0 || 1 || ½ || ½ || ½ || ½ || - || ½ || ½ || 0 || 1 || 5½ || 
|-
| 12 ||  || 0 || 0 || 1 || ½ || ½ || ½ || ½ || 0 || 0 || ½ || ½ || - || 0 || ½ || 0 || 4½ || 33.75
|-
| 13 ||  || 0 || 0 || 0 || 0 || 0 || ½ || 0 || 0 || ½ || 0 || ½ || 1 || - || 1 || 1 || 4½ || 20.50
|-
| 14 ||  || 0 || ½ || 0 || 0 || 0 || 0 || 0 || 0 || 0 || ½ || 1 || ½ || 0 || - || 1 || 3½ || 
|-
| 15 ||  || 0 || ½ || 0 || 0 || 0 || 0 || 0 || ½ || 0 || ½ || 0 || 1 || 0 || 0 || - || 2½ || 
|}

1959 Championship Match

The championship match was played in Moscow in 1959. Bykova won comfortably and retained her title.

{| class="wikitable" style="text-align:center"
|+Women's World Championship Match 1959
|-
! !! 1 !! 2 !! 3 !! 4 !! 5 !! 6 !! 7 !! 8 !! 9 !! 10 !! 11 !! 12 !! 13 !! Total
|-
| align=left | 
| 0 ||style="background:black; color:white"| 1 || ½ ||style="background:black; color:white"| 1 || 0 ||style="background:black; color:white"| ½ || 1 ||style="background:black; color:white"| ½ || ½ ||style="background:black; color:white"| 1 || 1 ||style="background:black; color:white"| 1 || ½ || 8½
|-
| align=left | 
|style="background:black; color:white"| 1 || 0 ||style="background:black; color:white"| ½ || 0 ||style="background:black; color:white"| 1 || ½ ||style="background:black; color:white"| 0 || ½ ||style="background:black; color:white"| ½ || 0 ||style="background:black; color:white"| 0 || 0 ||style="background:black; color:white"| ½ || 4½
|}

References

Women's World Chess Championships
1959 in chess